The Hinggan League (tr. Hinggan Aimag, Mongol Cyrillic: Хянган аймаг) is a prefecture-level subdivision of the Inner Mongolia Autonomous Region of the People's Republic of China. It borders Hulun Buir to the north, the Republic of Mongolia and Xilingol League to the west, Tongliao to the south and the provinces of Jilin and Heilongjiang to the east. The name is derived from the Greater Khingan mountain range that crosses the league from the northwest to the southeast.

Administrative subdivisions 
Hinggan league is divided into 2 county-level cities, 1 county and 3 banners:

Demographics 
In 2000, Hinggan League had 1,588,787 inhabitants (26.57 per km²).

Notes

Literature 
  9+121 pages.

References

External links 
 

Prefecture-level divisions of Inner Mongolia
Articles containing Mongolian script text